Julio Luciano (born 10 October 1977) is a retired Dominican Republic high jumper.

He won the silver medal at the 1997 Central American and Caribbean Championships, the bronze medal at the 1998 Central American and Caribbean Games, and the gold medal at the 1999 Central American and Caribbean Championships. He also competed at the 1996 Olympic Games and the 1997 World Championships without reaching the final.

Luciano's personal best jump is 2.24 metres, achieved in Santo Domingo in June 1996.

Competition record

References

1977 births
Living people
Dominican Republic high jumpers
Athletes (track and field) at the 1996 Summer Olympics
Olympic athletes of the Dominican Republic
Athletes (track and field) at the 1999 Pan American Games
Athletes (track and field) at the 2007 Pan American Games
Pan American Games competitors for the Dominican Republic
Dominican Republic male athletes
Male high jumpers
Central American and Caribbean Games bronze medalists for the Dominican Republic
Competitors at the 1998 Central American and Caribbean Games
Competitors at the 2006 Central American and Caribbean Games
Central American and Caribbean Games medalists in athletics
20th-century Dominican Republic people
21st-century Dominican Republic people